Michelle White "Miki" Bowman (born May 25, 1971) is an American attorney who served as a member of the Federal Reserve Board of Governors since 2018. She is the first person to fill the community bank seat on the board, a seat created by a 2015 law.

Previously, Bowman was the Kansas banking commissioner, from January 2017 through November 2018. She also held senior staff positions at the Federal Emergency Management Agency and Department of Homeland Security during the George W. Bush administration.

Early life and education
Bowman was born in Hawaii. When she was young, her family moved frequently, because of her father’s career in the U.S. Air Force. She lived much of her youth in Illinois, near St. Louis, and graduating from high school in Council Grove, Kansas.

Bowman graduated from the University of Kansas in Lawrence with a Bachelor of Science degree in Advertising and Journalism. She then earned a Juris Doctor from Washburn University School of Law in Topeka, graduating in 1996.

Career

U.S. Government 
Bowman worked as an intern for Senator Bob Dole from 1995 to 1996. Between 1997 and 2002, she served as a counsel to the U.S. House Committee on Transportation and Infrastructure and then to the Committee on Government Reform and Oversight.

In 2002, Bowman was appointed by President George W. Bush as Director of Congressional and Intergovernmental Affairs at the Federal Emergency Management Agency (FEMA); in 2003, when the Department of Homeland Security was established, she became a Deputy Assistant Secretary and Policy Advisor to Secretary Tom Ridge.

London 
In 2004, Bowman's husband’s job took the couple to London. There, she started her own public affairs and consulting business, the Bowman Group; she remained active in politics as chair of Republicans Abroad UK.

Banking
Bowman returned to the U.S. in 2010, joining the Farmers & Drovers Bank, her family's bank, as vice president, where she served as a director, compliance officer, and trust officer. The bank had assets of $181 million in 2017. Bowman left the bank to become the Kansas banking commissioner on January 31, 2017, after being nominated by Kansas Governor Sam Brownback in late 2016.

Federal Reserve

In November 2017, it was reported that President Donald Trump was considering nominating Bowman to fill a long-open seat on the   U.S. Federal Reserve Board of Governors. In April 2018, the White House announced that Trump would nominate Bowman to fill the fourteen-year term of Stanley Fischer, which expired on January 31, 2020, as well as to occupy the seat on the Board that represents community banks. 

In November 2018 Bowman was confirmed by the U.S. Senate by a vote of 64 to 34. On April 2, 2019, the White House announced that Trump planned to nominate Bowman to a full 14-year term on the Federal Reserve Board when her current term expires in January 2020.

Personal 
Bowman is married to Wes Bowman. The couple’s two children were born during the five years that they lived in England, between 2004 and 2010.

References

1971 births
Living people
Federal Reserve System governors
People from Council Grove, Kansas
Trump administration personnel
University of Kansas alumni
Washburn University School of Law alumni